Savior or Saviour may refer to:
A person who helps people achieve salvation, or saves them from something

Religion 
 Mahdi, the prophesied redeemer of Islam who will rule for seven, nine or nineteen years
 Maitreya
 Messiah, a saviour or liberator of a group of people, most commonly in the Abrahamic religions
 Messiah in Judaism
Jesus as the savior or redeemer in Christianity
 Zoroastrian tradition envisions three future saviors, including Saoshyant, [sou-shyuhnt] a figure of Zoroastrian eschatology who brings about the final renovation of the world, the Frashokereti
 Soter, derives from the Greek epithet  (sōtēr), meaning a saviour, a deliverer
 The Saviour (paramilitary organization) (Спас), a militant nationalist organization in Russia

Film and television
 The Savior (1971 film), French film about a girl and a Nazi officer
 The Savior (2014 film), Arabic-language film about Jesus of Nazareth
 The Saviour (Chinese: 救世者 Jiushizhe), a 1980 film directed Ronny Yu
 The Saviour (film) 2005 Australian short film
 "The Savior" (Once Upon a Time), the first episode of the sixth season of the American fantasy drama series Once Upon a Time
 Savior (film), 1998 film starring Dennis Quaid, Stellan Skarsgård and Nastassja Kinski
 "Saviors" (House), the 21st episode of the fifth season of Fox television series House

Music 
 Saviours (band), a stoner metal band

Albums
 Saviour (album), a 2002 album by the band Antimatter
 Savior (album), a 2015 album by Metro Station

Songs

 "Saviour" (Anggun song), 2005
 "Savior" (Iggy Azalea song), 2018
 "Saviour" (Lights song), 2009
 "Savior" (Rise Against song), 2008
 "Savior" (Skillet song), 2003
"Savior", a song by 30 Seconds to Mars, from their 2005 album A Beautiful Lie
"Saviour", a song by Alicia Keys, from her 2007 album As I Am
"Saviour", a song by Black Veil Brides, from their 2011 album Set the World on Fire
"Saviour", a song by Chipmunk, from his 2009 album I Am Chipmunk
"Saviour", a song by Dredg, from their 2009 album The Pariah, the Parrot, the Delusion
"Saviour", a song by Jacob Collier from his 2016 album In My Room
"Saviour", a song by Prince from Emancipation
"Savior", a song by Red Hot Chili Peppers from their 1999 album Californication
"Saviour", a song by VNV Nation, from their 1999 album Empires
"My Saviour", a song by Samael, from their 1996 album Passage
 "Saviour", a song by Kendrick Lamar from his 2022 album Mr. Morale & the Big Steppers

Literature 
 "Savior", a 2000 short science fiction story by Nancy Kress

Other
 Saviour (comics), a 1988 comic book published by Trident Comics
 sAviOr, an alias for Ma Jae-Yoon, former professional StarCraft player in Korea
 Windecker SAVIOR, an American unmanned aircraft

See also
 Salvador (disambiguation)
 Salvator (disambiguation)
 Salvatore (disambiguation)